Catlin Township is a township in Marion County, Kansas, United States.  As of the 2010 census, the township population was 187, including a fraction of the city of Peabody.

Geography

Communities
The township contains the following settlements:
 City of Peabody (north of 9th Street). The majority of Peabody is located in Peabody Township.

Cemeteries
The township contains the following cemeteries:
 Catlin Mennonite Church Cemetery, located in Section 17 T21S R3E.  The church was closed in 1961 then demolished in the 1960s.
 Prairie Lawn Cemetery (aka Brookdell Cemetery), located in Section 34 T21S R3E.  Main cemetery for city of Peabody.
 Tharp Cemetery, located in Section 2 T21S R3E.

Transportation
U.S. Route 50 passes along the southern township edge, and follows roughly parallel to the BNSF Railway.

See also
 Hamilton family

References

Further reading

External links
 Marion County website
 City-Data.com
 Marion County maps: Current, Historic, KDOT

Townships in Marion County, Kansas
Townships in Kansas